Miturgopelma paruwi is the proposed name for recently discovered species of spider of the family Miturgidae. The holotype of the species was found by a young Tasmanian on a "Bush Blitz" biology education program.

References

Miturgidae